Stefan Kapičić (born 1 December 1978) is a Serbian actor best known for his role of Colossus in Deadpool (2016) and Deadpool 2 (2018). He is also one of three members of the Council for Film Industry of Montenegro.

Early life 
Kapičić was born 1 December 1978 in Cologne, West Germany, the son of Slobodanka "Beba" Žugić, a Montenegrin actress, and Dragan Kapičić, a retired Serbian basketball player. His father played for Saturn Köln during that time. At three years of age the family returned to SFR Yugoslavia. His grandfather bought him his first comic book when he was six years old, which sparked what he called an "ongoing love" in a 2015 interview about his role in Deadpool. He studied acting at the Faculty of Dramatic Arts in Belgrade. He speaks Serbian, English, German  and Russian.

Career 
Kapičić played the role of his own father in the 2015 film Bićemo prvaci sveta (We Will Be the World Champions) about the Yugoslavian national basketball team which won the 1970 FIBA World Championship.

By 2015, Kapičić had accumulated more than 80 roles in television, film, and theater. He made it to the second round of a secret casting process for the X-Man Colossus in the superhero film Deadpool, learning what the production was only after he passed that round. Working with first-time director Tim Miller in Los Angeles, Kapičić did 120 takes during his third call of auditions, stretching the session an additional eight hours beyond its intended four-hour duration, before flying back to Dubrovnik, Croatia to perform Romeo and Juliet. Kapičić, a self-described "comic book geek" who considered Deadpool one of his favorite characters, was especially delighted when he learned he won the role, taking over from Daniel Cudmore, who had played the role in the X-Men films. Kapičić was selected because Miller wanted his version of Colossus, who is Russian in the comics, to have a Russian accent. The 6-foot-4 Kapičić portrayed the 7-and-a-half-foot tall character through a combination of voice work and motion capture, completing filming in mid-December 2015, eight weeks before the film's February 12, 2016 release date.

Personal life 
In December 2015, Kapičić became engaged to Croatian actress Ivana Horvat. They were married in 2017.

Filmography

Television

Film

Serbian dubs

Video games

References

External links 

 

1978 births
Living people
21st-century Serbian male actors
Serbian male film actors
Serbian male television actors
Serbian people of Montenegrin descent
Actors from Cologne
Male actors from Belgrade